Mickey's Choo-Choo is a 1929 Mickey Mouse short animated film released by Celebrity Pictures, as part of the Mickey Mouse film series. Ub Iwerks was the animator. It was the eleventh Mickey Mouse short to be produced, the eighth of that year, and was one of the series of early Disney cartoons that led Mickey Mouse to become a national fad by the end of 1929. Originally in black and white, this cartoon was of the ten Mickey Mouse cartoons colorized by the Walt Disney Company in 1991.

Plot
The cartoon opens with Mickey piloting a 2-2-0 steam engine, ringing his bell and blowing the engine's whistle. As the engine and his coal tender back to collect a boxcar, the engine rests with Mickey, his railroad engineer, fuelling him, and feeding his engine with coal from the tender. As the engine eats too much coal and burps, Mickey decides to have some spaghetti, until Minnie comes along. After Mickey finishes his lunch, Minnie arrives with a violin that she can play, and hops onto the freight car. Minnie plays a musical song (Dvořák's Humoresque) while Mickey does the same. As Mickey looks at his watch, only to realize that they are late, he yells 'All aboard!' to the engine, which whistles in cheerful response after Mickey gets on board. The engine slowly starts out of the station and chuffs cheerfully through the beautiful countryside toward a hill and struggles up it. The engine ends having problems and starts to cry. The cartoon ends with Mickey pushing the boxcar so hard that it comes loose from the engine, runs into a cow, and explodes. In the final shot, Mickey and Minnie ride a handcar into the sunset.

Production
Some of the gags in the cartoon are recycled from the 1927 Oswald the Lucky Rabbit short Trolley Troubles. This is the first cartoon in which Mickey says more than a couple of words, "this time in a voice that sounds like Walt's."

The soundtrack includes Mickey singing "I've Been Working on the Railroad" and playing part of Antonín Dvořák's Humoresques on his spaghetti. Minnie's ride on the train is set to the tune of "Dixie".

The closing image of Mickey and Minnie operating a handcar inspired a famous toy version, manufactured by the Lionel Corporation.  The toy company made so much money from this item and others like it that Mickey was known as "the mouse that saved Lionel."

Reception
In Mickey's Movies: The Theatrical Films of Mickey Mouse, Gijs Grob writes, "The finale of Mickey's Choo-Choo is remarkably fast and full of action. Moreover, it's the first Disney cartoon to feature real dialogue. Most of the cartoon, however, has a remarkably slow pace, and even some awkwardly silent moments. There's hardly any plot and Mickey and Minnie's designs are inconsistent, ranging from sophisticated (with an extra facial line) to downright poor. The end result is an average entry in Mickey's canon."

Motion Picture News (October 12, 1929) said: "This issue of the Mickey Mouse series by Walt Disney is a laugh from start to finish. In addition to sound effects this one has music and dialogue and a railway thrill with a runaway freight car. The little comedy proved to be the hit of the Strand, New York, bill, topping everything else on the program for laughs and entertainment value."

Voice cast
 Mickey Mouse: Walt Disney
 Minnie Mouse: Walt Disney

Home media
The short was released on December 7, 2004 on Walt Disney Treasures: Mickey Mouse in Black and White, Volume Two: 1929-1935.

See also

Mickey Mouse (film series)
1929 in film

References

Further reading

External links
D23 entry
IMDb
MUBI

1920s Disney animated short films
1929 short films
1929 comedy films
American black-and-white films
Mickey Mouse short films
Films directed by Ub Iwerks
Films produced by Walt Disney
1929 animated films
1920s English-language films
Animated films about trains
American animated short films
Animated films about mice